Rena DeAngelo is an American set decorator. She was nominated at the 88th Academy Awards in the category Best Production Design for her work on the film Bridge of Spies. Her nomination was shared with Adam Stockhausen and Bernhard Henrich. DeAngelo also won an Primetime Emmy Award for the television series Mad Men in the category of Outstanding Art Direction for a Single-Camera Series.

References

External links

Living people
American set decorators
Primetime Emmy Award winners
Year of birth missing (living people)
Place of birth missing (living people)